Alexander Thomas Lowes (born 14 September 1990) is an English motorcycle racer. He signed in October 2019 for the Kawasaki Racing Team in Superbike World Championship as team-mate to multi-world champion Jonathan Rea.

He competed in World Superbike on a Yamaha YZF-R1 for Pata Yamaha Official WorldSBK Team, but learned of the loss of his position from 2020 to Toprak Razgatlioglu in August 2019. 

He won 2016, 2017 and 2018 Suzuka 8 Hours and was the 2013 title holder of the British Superbike Championship riding a Honda CBR1000RR for Samsung Honda. He previously raced in the British Supersport Championship and the FIM Superstock 1000 Cup. He is the identical twin brother of fellow rider Sam Lowes.

Career

Early career
Born in Lincoln, England, Lowes began racing motorcycles at the age of 6 years old. In 1998 he switched to motorcross and raced there until 2001, racing in various championships around England. In 2002 he made the switch to road racing in the JRA Championship, racing a Cagiva finishing 2nd overall. In 2003 he raced in the Aprilia Superteen Championship despite only being 12 years old at the beginning of the season. Despite everybody else taking part in the championship being between the age of 13 to 19 years old, Lowes managed to finished 4th overall.

In 2004, he made the switch to the GP125 MRO Championship, he also raced in two events in the German championship, and one event in the British Championship, at the end of the year he finished runner-up in the GP125 championship, including a win in the Pembrey Circuit at Wales. Next year he switched to the British 125cc championship, racing there until 2006, he also made his debut in the 125cc World Championship racing as a wildcard in Donington Park but he did not finish the race, in 2007 he switched to the British Supersport Championship riding a Honda CBR600RR, he was the youngest racer in the Championship at the time making some good results like a 10th place in Thruxton and Croft, finishing behind various experienced racers in the championship.

Superstock Championship
For 2008, he switched to the European Superstock 600 championship riding a Kawasaki for Kawasaki Italia he had a best finish of 2nd, finishing 16th overall, in 2009 he switched to the FIM Superstock 1000 Championship riding a MV Agusta for the factory, but he struggled during the season, finishing in the points twice, and he and the team missed the final race of the season, due to MV Agusta owners Harley-Davidson putting the marque for sale. His struggles continued for 2010, when he signed with a new Suzuki team, but the team folded before the season began, after this he received an offer from Seton Tuning Yamaha team and he finished 12th in the final standings with 41 points, despite missing 3 races, he also made his British Superbike debut riding a KTM in the then new EVO class he finished 35th in the points scoring 1 point. He also made his debut as Wildcard in the World Supersport Championship riding a Yamaha, for Silverstone but he retired due to an accident in the race.

British Superbike Championship
In 2011, he raced for four different teams in the year, he began the year with Team WFR in the EVO class riding a Honda, after 3 rounds with a best finish of 5th,  he replaced Stuart Easton in the MSS Colchester Kawasaki team he had a best finish of 7th with the team, later he replaced an injured Jonathan Rea in Ten Kate Racing for the Brno and Silverstone rounds, He had a best finish of 15th in Brno in Race 1, but he retired in the next 3 races, returning to the British Championship, he lost his ride with the MSS Colchester Kawasaki team, he finished the season with the Motorpoint Yamaha team  finishing the season with 60 points with a best finish of 5th with WFR Honda and 7th with Motorpoint Yamaha.

For 2012 he returned to race with Team WFR in the championship, he had a highly successful season finishing 4th making a double win at Silverstone Circuit and entering the championship Showdown he finished the season with 584 points.

For 2013 he joined Samsung Honda, the works team for Honda in BSB. He was highly successful, winning the championship over three-times champion Shane Byrne at the last race at Brands Hatch in October 2013. He then announced that he would be leaving BSB in 2014 to join the World Superbike Championship, resulting in Honda closing down their BSB team for 2014.

Career statistics

British Superbike Championship

Races by year
(key)

Supersport World Championship

Races by year
(key) (Races in bold indicate pole position; races in italics indicate fastest lap)

Superbike World Championship

Races by year
(key) (Races in bold indicate pole position; races in italics indicate fastest lap)

* Season still in progress.

Grand Prix motorcycle racing

By season

Races by year
(key) (Races in bold indicate pole position, races in italics indicate fastest lap)

Suzuka 8 Hours results

References

External links

britishsuperbike.com rider profile
Official website

1990 births
British identical twins
British motorcycle racers
English motorcycle racers
Living people
British Superbike Championship riders
British Supersport Championship riders
Supersport World Championship riders
Superbike World Championship riders
Twin sportspeople
English twins
Sportspeople from Lincoln, England
FIM Superstock 1000 Cup riders
125cc World Championship riders
MotoGP World Championship riders
Tech3 MotoGP riders